Parwanipur (Nepali: परवानीपुर ) is the smallest rural municipality in Bara District in Madhesh province of Nepal. It was formed in 2016 occupying current 5 sections (wards) from previous 5 former VDCs. It occupies an area of 15.48 km2 with a total population of 22,787. It lies approximately 12 km north to the Raxaul custom of Indian state of Bihar. Parwanipur is known as an industrial corridor of Nepal. Tribhuvan Highway links Parwanipur city with Birgunj metropolitan and Nepal's capital, Kathmandu. Parwanipur is known as industrial manufacturing hub which encompass variety of company such as pharmaceuticals, textile, plastic, steel, vegetable ghee and food industry. This municipality is also known for its major political scrum which has originated many prominent leaders and political activist.

References 

Rural municipalities of Nepal established in 2017
Populated places in Bara District
Rural municipalities in Madhesh Province